William Jay Lambert III (born October 2, 1948) is an American bishop of the Episcopal Church. He was the sixth bishop of the Diocese of Eau Claire based in the state of Wisconsin from March 2013 to December 2020. In October 2021 he became rector of St. Phillip's Episcopal Church in Jacksonville, Florida.

Biography 
Lambert received a Bachelor of Arts in history and public affairs from Rollins College, a Masters of Arts in history from the University of Georgia and a Masters of Divinity from Nashotah House. He also served in the United States Navy and was a United States Naval Reserve chaplain. He was elected bishop of the Diocese of Eau Claire on November 10, 2012. He was consecrated to the episcopate on March 16, 2013.

See also
 List of Episcopal bishops of the United States
 Historical list of the Episcopal bishops of the United States

Notes

21st-century Anglican bishops in the United States
Religious leaders from Wisconsin
Nashotah House alumni
Rollins College alumni
University of Georgia alumni
1948 births
Living people
Episcopal bishops of Eau Claire